PKN can mean:
A type of fertiliser used in horticulture containing a ratio of phosphorus (P), potassium (K) and nitrogen (N).
Pertti Kurikan Nimipäivät, a Finnish punk band
A member of the protein kinase family of enzymes
PKN1, protein kinase N1
Protestant Church in the Netherlands
Personal knowledge networking
Program Khidmat Negara, Malaysia's National Service program
The Palace of Culture and Science, the tallest building in Poland
A variant version of the PK machine gun
PKN, the IATA code of Iskandar Airport in Indonesia
 Polish Committee for Standardization, Polski Komitet Normalizacyjny